Goodenia hartiana, commonly known as Hart's goodenia, is a species of flowering plant in the family Goodeniaceae and is endemic to Western Australia. It is an erect to spreading perennial herb or subshrub with lance-shaped to egg-shaped leaves with the narrower end towards the base, racemes of blue or purple flowers and oval to cylindrical fruit.

Description

Taxonomy and naming
Goodenia hartiana was first formally described in 2006 by Leigh William Sage in the journal Nuytsia from specimens collected in the Rudall River region by Raymond P. Hart in 1992. The specific epithet (hartiana) honours the collector of the type material.

Distribution and habitat
Hart's goodenia grows on sand dunes in the Little Sandy Desert, Great Sandy Desert and Pilbara biogeographic regions of Western Australia.

Conservation status
Goodenia hartiana is classified as "Priority Two" by the Western Australian Government Department of Parks and Wildlife meaning that it is poorly known and from only one or a few locations.

References

hartiana
Eudicots of Western Australia
Plants described in 2006